Rich Romer (born February 27, 1966) is a former American football linebacker. He played in the National Football League (NFL) for the Cincinnati Bengals from 1988 to 1989.

References

1966 births
Living people
American football linebackers
Union Dutchmen football players
Cincinnati Bengals players